"Keep Yourself Alive" is the debut single by the British rock band Queen. Written by guitarist Brian May, it is the opening track on the band's eponymous debut album (1973). It was released as Queen's first single along with  "Son and Daughter" as the B-side. "Keep Yourself Alive" was largely ignored upon its release and failed to chart on either side of the Atlantic. It was also re-released as the non-album B-side of "Lily of the Valley" in 1974.

In 2008, Rolling Stone Magazine rated the song 31st on its list of "The 100 Greatest Guitar Songs of All Time".

Writing and recording
According to Mark Hodkinson, author of Queen: The Early Years, "Keep Yourself Alive" was conceived on acoustic guitars during Queen's practice sessions at Imperial College and the garden at Ferry Road in 1970. At the time, Queen had not yet found a permanent bassist; the group consisted of lead singer Freddie Mercury, guitarist Brian May, and drummer Roger Taylor. In a radio special about their 1977 album News of the World, May said he had penned the lyrics thinking them ironic and tongue-in-cheek, but their sense was completely changed when Mercury sang them.

The first version of "Keep Yourself Alive" was recorded in summer 1971 at De Lane Lea Studios. It was produced by Louie Austin and includes the intro played on Brian May's Hallfredh acoustic guitar. All of the song elements were already present, including Mercury's call-and-response vocals (verses) and during the break, where Taylor sang a line and May answered it. This demo version remains May's personal favourite take of the song.

They subsequently made several attempts to "recapture the magic" when they went on to capture the "real" version at the famous Trident Studios. The version mixed by Mike Stone was the only one considered moderately acceptable by the band, and was the one deemed fit to release as a single. This version includes Mercury doing all of the harmony vocals in the chorus (multi-tracking himself) and May singing the "two steps nearer to my grave" line instead of Mercury (who did it in earlier versions and would often do so live). This particular recording does not utilise May's acoustic guitar; the printed transcription on EMI Music Publishing's Off the Record sheet music lists at least seven different electric guitar parts, one of which uses a prominent phasing effect. It should also be noted that this recording includes the line "Come on and get it, get it, get it, boy, keep yourself alive," which was not in the original version.

Live performances
The newly formed Queen would quickly add "Keep Yourself Alive" to their live set. Mercury commented that the song "was a very good way of telling people what Queen was about in those days" (RAM, 21 May 1976, p 17). Indeed, the number included a drum solo by Taylor and one line sung/spoken by him.

"Keep Yourself Alive" was part of the band's live set until the early 1980s. Through late 1979 to 1981, the band would play an improvisational jam before the start of the song then after the drum solo, it would morph into Taylor's timpani drum solo followed by May's echo-plexed guitar solo spot before either segueing into "Brighton Rock" finale or a drum and guitar climax that segued into a Flash Gordon medley (which consisted of "Vultan's Theme"/"Battle Theme"/"Flash's Theme"/"The Hero"). The band would not play it again until 1984 on The Works tour as part of a medley of old songs (with "Somebody to Love", "Killer Queen", "Seven Seas of Rhye", and "Liar").

In live performances, Mercury would often sing the line "all you people keep yourself alive" (which is sung only two times in the studio version) in place of the more-repeated line "take you all your time and a money honey you'll survive".

The song also appears on the 1989 live album release At the Beeb, originally recorded for BBC Radio 1's programme Sound of the 70s in 1973. Although not released until much later, this live studio recording predates Queen's eponymous debut and presents a version of "Keep Yourself Alive" more in line with that of their live set.

Release and reception
EMI Records released "Keep Yourself Alive" as a single in the United Kingdom on 6 July 1973, a week before Queen hit the stores. A few months later, on 9 October 1973, Elektra Records released the single in the United States. However, "Keep Yourself Alive" received little radio airplay and was largely ignored on both sides of the Atlantic; it failed to chart in either the UK or the US. According to Queen biographer Mark Hodkinson, "[o]n five separate occasions EMI's pluggers attempted to secure it space on [Britain's Radio 1] play list", yet they were denied each time - reportedly because the record took "too long to happen". "Keep Yourself Alive" is the only Queen single not to have charted in the UK.

The single received mixed reviews from the British music press. New Musical Express praised the "cleanly recorded" song, as well as the "good singer", and quipped that if Queen "look half as good as they sound, they could be huge". The reviewer for Melody Maker felt that Queen made "an impressive debut with a heavily phased guitar intro and energetic vocal attack"; however, he thought the song unoriginal, and unlikely to become a hit. On the other hand, Disc magazine's critic believed the single "should do well". The review praised "Keep Yourself Alive"'s drum solo, as well as its "attractively stilted, vaguely Hendrix-y lead riff". The South Yorkshire Times rated the single as "good"; the newspaper predicted that "[i]f this debut sound from Queen is anything to go by, they should make very interesting listening in the future." In his album review of Queen for Rolling Stone Magazine, Gordon Fletcher hailed "Keep Yourself Alive" as "a truly awesome move for the jugular."

Retrospectively, "Keep Yourself Alive" is cited as the highlight of Queen's debut album. Stephen Thomas Erlewine of Allmusic wrote that while Queen "too often... plays like a succession of ideas instead of succinct songs", "[t]here is an exception to that rule — the wild, rampaging opener 'Keep Yourself Alive' - one of their very best songs." In 2008, Rolling Stone Magazine rated the song 31st on its list of "The 100 Greatest Guitar Songs of All Time". The magazine dubbed "Keep Yourself Alive" as "Brian May's statement of purpose: a phalanx of overdubbed guitars crying out in unison, with rhythm and texture from over-the-top effects...an entire album's worth of riffs crammed into a single song."

Personnel
Freddie Mercury - lead and backing vocals
Brian May - electric guitar, lead vocals on middle eight, backing vocals
Roger Taylor - drums, percussion, tambourine, cowbell, lead vocals on middle eight, backing vocals
John Deacon - bass guitar

Track listing
All songs written by Brian May, except where noted.1973 UK 7" single"Keep Yourself Alive" – 3:47
"Son and Daughter" – 3:201974 Australian 7" single"Keep Yourself Alive" – 3:47
"Son and Daughter" (censored) – 3:121975 US 7" single reissue'''
"Keep Yourself Alive" – 3:29
"Lily of the Valley (Freddie Mercury) – 1:35
"God Save the Queen (traditional, arr. May) – 1:15

References
 Hodkinson, Mark. Queen: The Early Years''. Omnibus Press (2004). 3rd edition. .

Notes

External links

Lyrics at Genius
"Keep Yourself Alive" at Queenpedia

1973 songs
1973 debut singles
Queen (band) songs
Song recordings produced by Roy Thomas Baker
Songs written by Brian May
Music videos directed by Bruce Gowers
Song recordings produced by John Anthony (record producer)
EMI Records singles
Elektra Records singles
Hollywood Records singles
British power pop songs